Inna Evgenevna Suslina (born January 5, 1979) is a Russian team handball player, who last played for HC Vardar and Russia women's national handball team. She was on the successful gold medal Team Russia in the 2007 World Women's Handball Championship.

She received a silver medal at the 2008 Summer Olympics in Beijing.

References

External links

Russian female handball players
Handball players at the 2008 Summer Olympics
Olympic handball players of Russia
Olympic silver medalists for Russia
Sportspeople from Tashkent
Living people
Olympic medalists in handball
Medalists at the 2008 Summer Olympics
1979 births
20th-century Russian women
21st-century Russian women